General elections were held in Bolivia on 1 June 1997. As no candidate for the presidency received over 50% of the vote, the National Congress was required to elect a president on 4 August. Hugo Banzer of Nationalist Democratic Action (ADN) was subsequently elected. Whilst the ADN emerged as the largest party in Congress, it failed to win a majority of seats, and formed a coalition government with the Revolutionary Left Movement, Conscience of Fatherland and the Civic Solidarity Union.

Electoral system

As a result of modifications to the constitution in 1994 and 1995, the minimum age to vote in this election was reduced to eighteen years. An amendment regarding the term of office also entered force meaning that the elected president would serve a 5-year term rather than the previous 4-year term without the possibility of reelection.

Campaign
Incumbent president Gonzalo Sánchez de Lozada chose René Blattmann, minister of justice and human rights, as the MNR's presidential candidate. Blattmann's reformations to the judicial system had gained him great popularity among the population with him holding a 34% electoral preference to Hugo Banzer's 14% upon the announcement of his candidacy in December 1996. However, René Blattmann surprisingly renounced his candidacy at the end of January 1997. Juan Carlos Durán became the new MNR candidate but the damage to the party's electoral campaign was irreversible.

Hugo Banzer, who had run in the past five elections, had stated in 1993 that he would not present himself again as a candidate. Nevertheless, Banzer announced his 1997 candidacy anyway. Former president Jaime Paz Zamora of the MIR also announced his intention to seek a second term. 

The "neo-populist" Max Fernández of the UCS and Carlos Palenque of CONDEPA had seen their parties' best performances in 1993. However, the premature death of both leaders hurt their parties' chances of winning. Jhonny Fernández, Max Fernández's son, was not yet of legal age to run leading the UCS to present as their candidate Ivo Kuljis Fuchner. Interestingly, Fuchner had been Carlos Palenque's CONDEPA running mate in 1993. CONDEPA, in turn, presented Remedios Loza, the first female presidential candidate in Bolivia history. The fact that Loza was Aymara won her some support among Bolivia's marginalized indigenous population.

Economic and social issues dominated the campaign, with all major parties promising to continue the free market policies implemented by outgoing President Gonzalo Sánchez de Lozada. Whilst Juan Carlos Durán emphasised the free market reforms, Hugo Banzer promised to improve the lives of the indigenous population.

Results
Ultimately, the divided electoral field and the woes of the MNR resulted in Hugo Banzer claiming a narrow plurality vote victory of 22.26%, the lowest margin of victory for any presidential candidate in Bolivian history.

Congressional ballot
As no candidate reached the required 50% majority, the National Congress convened to elect the president. Members of both chambers voted on the president. Banzer was supported by his ADN-NFR-PDC political alliance as well as by the MIR, CONDEPA, and UCS. Juan Carlos Durán would only receive the support of the MNR. The 4 IU and 5 MBL deputies abstained.

See also
Bolivian National Congress, 1997–2002

Notes

References

Bibliography 

 

1997 in Bolivia
Elections in Bolivia
1997 elections in South America
1997